Editions Didier Millet is a publisher of illustrated general and reference books, emphasising strongly on Southeast Asia. The company also produces books and catalogues for museums, galleries, corporations and other institutions.

The company was established in 1989, headquartered in Singapore. It has offices in Kuala Lumpur, Bali and Paris. It sells and distributes its books in Southeast Asia, and sells elsewhere by  co-editions with other publishers, including   Harvard University Press and Tuttle in the US, HarperCollins and Thames & Hudson in the UK, Christian Verlag in Germany and Oxford University Press and Penguin in India. Archipelago Press is an imprint of Editions Didier Millet.

Books published by Editions Didier Millet
Editions Didier Millet publishes approximately 40 titles a year. Some important titles include:

 Chronicle of Malaysia
 Chronicle of Singapore
 Chronicle of Thailand
  Sketchbook series
 The Chic Collection
  The Encyclopedia of Malaysia
  Indonesian Heritage Series
  Singapore: A Pictorial History 1819–2000
  Malaysia: A Pictorial History 1400–2004
 Letters and Books of Sir Stamford Raffles and Lady Raffles
 Singapore: The Encyclopedia
 Thailand: Nine Days in the Kingdom

References

External links

Les Éditions du Pacifique

Book publishing companies of Singapore
Publishing companies established in 1989